The city of Blackshear is the county seat of Pierce County, Georgia, United States. As of the 2020 census, the city had a population of 3,506.

Blackshear is part of the Waycross Micropolitan Statistical Area.

Geography
Blackshear is located at  (31.298941, -82.247726).

History
Blackshear was founded in 1858 to serve as the seat of the newly formed Pierce County. The city was named after General David Blackshear, who authorized the construction of roads, bridges and 11 forts for defense. He was a patriot in the American Revolution, fighting in the Battle of Moore's Creek Bridge and the Battle of Buford's Bridge. He served as a general during the War of 1812. He also served in the Georgia state legislature as Senator of Laurens County.

During the American Civil War, the city became a temporary prisoner-of-war camp for more than 5,000 Union prisoners. This site is marked by a historical landmark sign.

The primary crop of this south Georgia community was once tobacco, and is where the first brick tobacco warehouse in Georgia was built, known as the Brantley Brick.

Demographics

2020 census

As of the 2020 United States census, there were 3,506 people, 1,355 households, and 898 families residing in the city.

2000 census
As of the census of 2000, there were 3,283 people, 1,354 households, and 894 families residing in the city. The racial makeup of the city was 77.03% White, 21.35% African American, 0.30% Native American, 0.18% Asian, 0.09% Pacific Islander, 0.43% from other races, and 0.61% from two or more races. Hispanic or Latino of any race were 1.01% of the population.

There were 1,354 households, out of which 30.0% had children under the age of 18 living with them, 45.3% were married couples living together, 17.8% had a female householder with no husband present, and 33.9% were non-families. 32.0% of all households were made up of individuals, and 15.1% had someone living alone who was 65 years of age or older.  The average household size was 2.35 and the average family size was 2.96.

In the city, the population was spread out, with 25.3% under the age of 18, 7.6% from 18 to 24, 24.6% from 25 to 44, 24.5% from 45 to 64, and 18.0% who were 65 years of age or older.  The median age was 40 years. For every 100 females, there were 81.8 males.  For every 100 females age 18 and over, there were 76.3 males.

The median income for a household in the city was $27,285, and the median income for a family was $38,414. Males had a median income of $30,263 versus $22,067 for females. The per capita income for the city was $14,611.  About 16.9% of families and 21.0% of the population were below the poverty line, including 25.1% of those under age 18 and 22.0% of those age 65 or over.

Education

Pierce County School District 
The Pierce County School District holds grades pre-school to grade twelve, and consists of three elementary schools, a middle school and a high school. The district has 216 full-time teachers and over 3,240 students. Four schools in the district are located in Blackshear.
Blackshear Elementary School
Midway Elementary School
Patterson Elementary School
Pierce County Middle School
Pierce County High School

Private Education 
Crossroads Christian Academy

Notable people
Stetson Bennett (born 1997), football player for the University of Georgia Bulldogs. Two-time national champion. 
Nikki DeLoach (born 1979), actress and singer born in Waycross, but was raised in Blackshear
KaDee Strickland (born 1975), actress

References

External links
    City of Blackshear website
 The Blackshear Times (Newspaper)
 The Pierce County Press (Newspaper)

Cities in Georgia (U.S. state)
Cities in Pierce County, Georgia
County seats in Georgia (U.S. state)
Waycross, Georgia micropolitan area